Dan Brady is the name of:

Dan Brady (ice hockey) (born 1950), American ice hockey goaltender
Dan Brady (Illinois politician) (born 1961), member of the Illinois House of Representatives
Dan Brady (Ohio politician), American politician from Ohio